Ernest Shepherd (14 August 1919 – 2001) was an English footballer who played in the Football League as an outside left for Fulham, West Bromwich Albion, Hull City and Queens Park Rangers. He went on to manage Southend United.

Shepherd was born in Wombwell, near Barnsley, in Yorkshire. He joined Fulham in April 1938, following a successful trial in September 1937, before signing for West Bromwich Albion in December 1948, moving on again only after only three months to Hull City. He joined Queens Park Rangers in 1950, and made his debut in August that year against Chesterfield. Shepherd played 219 league games for QPR scoring 51 goals before retiring from playing in 1957.

He went on to coach both in England, for Hastings United and Bradford Park Avenue, and abroad, in Iceland and for Al-Wasl in the United Arab Emirates. From 1967 to 1969 was manager of Southend United.

Shepherd died in Eastwood, Essex, in 2001.

References

1919 births
2001 deaths
People from Wombwell
Footballers from South Yorkshire
English footballers
Association football forwards
Fulham F.C. players
West Bromwich Albion F.C. players
Hull City A.F.C. players
Queens Park Rangers F.C. players
English Football League players
English football managers
Southend United F.C. managers
Sportspeople from Yorkshire
Brentford F.C. wartime guest players
Association football midfielders